Häljarps IF is a Swedish football club located in Häljarp.

Background
Häljarps IF currently plays in Division 4 Skåne Nordvästra which is the sixth tier of Swedish football. They play their home matches at the Häljarps IP in Häljarp.

The club is affiliated to Skånes Fotbollförbund.

Season to season

In their most successful period Häljarps IF competed in the following divisions:

In recent seasons Häljarps IF have competed in the following divisions:

Footnotes

External links
 Häljarps IF – Official website

Sport in Skåne County
Football clubs in Skåne County
1930 establishments in Sweden
Association football clubs established in 1930